The women's eight competition at the 1992 Summer Olympics took place at took place at Lake of Banyoles, Spain.

Competition format

The competition consisted of two main rounds (heats and finals) as well as a repechage. The 8 boats were divided into two heats for the first round, with 4 boats in each heat. The first-place boat in each heat (2 boats total) advanced directly to the "A" final. The remaining 6 boats were placed in the repechage. The repechage featured a single heat. The top 4 boats in the repechage advanced to the "A" final, while the remaining 2 boats (5th and 6th placers in the repechage) were sent to the "B" final. 

The boats in the "A" final competed for medals and 4th through 6th place; the boats in the "B" final competed for 7th and 8th.

All races were over a 2000 metre course.

Results

Heats

Heat 1

Heat 2

Repechage

Finals

Final B

Final A

Final classification

The following rowers took part:

References

Rowing at the 1992 Summer Olympics
Women's events at the 1992 Summer Olympics